Szkocja  is a village in the administrative district of Gmina Szubin, within Nakło County, Kuyavian-Pomeranian Voivodeship, in north-central Poland. Its name is also the Polish word for "Scotland".

The village has a population of 206.

References

Szkocja